Kings Peak is the highest peak in the U.S. state of Utah,

Description
Kings Peak is located just south of the spine of the central Uinta Mountains, in the Ashley National Forest in northeastern Utah, in north-central Duchesne County. It lies within the boundaries of the High Uintas Wilderness. The peak is approximately  due east of central Salt Lake City, and  due north of the town of Duchesne.

There are three popular routes to the summit; a scramble up the east slope, a hike up the northern ridge, and a long but relatively easy hike up the southern slope. The peak was named for Clarence King, a surveyor in the area and the first director of the United States Geological Survey. Kings Peak is generally regarded as the hardest state highpoint that can be climbed without specialist rock climbing skills and/or guiding. The easiest route requires a  round trip hike.

See also

 List of U.S. states and territories by elevation
 List of Ultras of the United States
 South Kings Peak

References

External links

 
 Geology of Kings Peak

Mountains of Utah
Features of the Uinta Mountains
Mountains of Duchesne County, Utah
Highest points of U.S. states
Ashley National Forest
North American 4000 m summits